German submarine U-1106 was a Type VIIC/41 U-boat of Nazi Germany's Kriegsmarine during World War II.

She was ordered on 14 October 1941, and was laid down on 28 July 1943, at Nordseewerke, Emden, as yard number 228. She was launched on 26 May 1944, and commissioned under the command of Oberleutnant zur See Erwin Bartke on 5 July 1944.

Design
German Type VIIC/41 submarines were preceded by the heavier Type VIIC submarines. U-1106 had a displacement of  when at the surface and  while submerged. She had two shafts and two  propellers.

U-1106 was fitted with five  torpedo tubes (four fitted at the bow and one at the stern), fourteen torpedoes or 26 TMA or TMB Naval mines, one  SK C/35 naval gun, (220 rounds), one  Flak M42 and two  C/30 anti-aircraft guns. The boat had a complement of between forty-four and fifty-two.

Service history
On 29 March 1945, nine days out of Horten, on her first, and only, war patrol, she was located by a British Liberator aircraft of the 224 Squadron RAF/O. U-1106 was sunk by depth charges in the Norwegian Sea, north of the Shetland Islands, with all 46 of her crew.

See also
 Battle of the Atlantic

References

Bibliography

External links

German Type VIIC/41 submarines
U-boats commissioned in 1944
World War II submarines of Germany
1944 ships
Ships built in Emden
Maritime incidents in March 1945
World War II shipwrecks in the Norwegian Sea
U-boats sunk by British aircraft
U-boats sunk by depth charges